Simonet may refer to:
 Denis Simonet (b. 1985), Swiss politician and president of the Pirate Party Switzerland
 Enrique Simonet (1866–1927), Spanish painter.
 Francisco Javier Simonet (1829 - 1897), Spanish historian, lexicographer, Arabist and Orientalist
 François Simonet de Coulmier (1741–1818), also known as Abbé de Coulmier
 Henri Simonet  (1931–1996), Belgian politician
 Jacques Simonet (1963–2007), Belgian politician
 Jacques André Simonet (1941-2022), French actor, best known as Jacques Perrin
 Marie-Dominique Simonet (1959), Belgian politician and minister, member of the Humanist Democratic Centre, vice-president of the French Community of Belgium
 Max Simonet, American talk show host of FishCenter Live